Sebastian Henriksson (born 12 October 1974) is a Swedish former footballer who played as a forward.

Henriksson played for Degerfors IF, Örgryte IS, IFK Göteborg and Odd Grenland and Örebro SK before playing for Degerfors IF a second time.

He has been capped twice for Sweden.

References

1974 births
Living people
Swedish footballers
Degerfors IF players
Örgryte IS players
IFK Göteborg players
Odds BK players
Örebro SK players
Allsvenskan players
Eliteserien players
Expatriate footballers in Norway
Swedish expatriate footballers
Swedish expatriate sportspeople in Norway
Association football forwards